Umeå Open is an annual music festival taking place in Umeå, Västerbotten, Sweden at the end of March. It is arranged by the local culture organization Kulturföreningen Humlan. Bands and artists from Europe, America and Asia perform alongside acts from Sweden and local acts in the Umeå Folkets Hus venue in the center of Umeå. Other venues where Umeå Open takes place are: Hamnmagasinet, Tegskyrkan, Verket and Guitars - The Museum.

Along with music, Umeå Open has a conference and a host of related events. Born from the popularity of the 1997 PopStad award to Umeå by Swedish radio, the festival has been held since 1998 and is regularly sold out in advance.

Artists who have performed at Umeå Open

International Artists

 The Magnetic Fields
 Yelle
 Charli XCX
 Alphaville
 Le Tigre
 Kavinsky
 Interpol
 M O N E Y
 The Afghan Whigs
 Atmosphere
 The Bell Orchestre
 Chicks on Speed
 Ed Harcourt
 Euroboys
 Handsomeboy Technique
 Jeans Team
 The Jesus Lizard
 The Make-Up
 Mark Eitzel
 Mates Of State
 Mayhem
 Mental Kombat
 Motorpsycho
 P.K. 14
 Poison The Well
 The Pipettes
 Stereo Total
 Teenage Fanclub
 Turbonegro

Swedish artists

 Refused
 First Aid Kit
 Cult of Luna
 Robyn
 Hellacopters
 Meshuggah
 José González
 Timbuktu
 Håkan Hellström
 Mando Diao
 bob hund
 The Bear Quartet
 Den Svenska Björnstammen
 Maskinen
 Slagsmålsklubben
 Daniel Adams-Ray
 The Soundtrack of Our Lives
 The Ark
 Sahara Hotnights
 Salem Al Fakir
 Asta Kask
 Jens Lekman
 Doktor Kosmos
 Entombed
 Final Exit
 Frida Hyvönen
 Ida Redig
 Lilla Namo
 Det Stora Monstret
 Grand Tone Music
 The Haunted
 Heed
 Honey Is Cool
 Isolation Years
 Komeda
 Nicolai Dunger
 Nocturnal Rites
 The (International) Noise Conspiracy
 Randy
 Silverbullit
 Väärt
 Caotico
 eberhard kcch
 Üni Foreman
 Gonza-Ra
 Matriarkatet
 Everyday Mistakes
 Starmarket
 Tiger Bell
 Tingsek
 The Vectors
 The Wannadies
 Weeping Willows
 Abhinanda

External links
Umeå Open Home Page

Music festivals in Sweden
Umeå
Recurring events established in 1998
Tourist attractions in Västerbotten County
Spring (season) events in Sweden